Disley is a village and civil parish in Cheshire, England. The population at the 2011 Census was 4,294. To the north, the River Goyt and the Peak Forest Canal, which opened in 1800, pass along the edge of the village. Today, it is a dormitory village retaining a semi-rural character.

The parish includes part of the neighbouring village of Newtown, the bulk of which is in Derbyshire.

History
Its Anglo-Saxon name was Dystiglegh, meaning "wood or clearing by a mound" or possibly "windy settlement". In the 13th century, in the time of Edward I, there are references to confirmatory grants of land made to Jordan de Dystelegh of Disley Hall and Roger de Stanley-de-Dystelegh of Stanley Hall in the district, pointing to even older local settlements. It later had the name Dystelegh.

Disley was the home of several farmsteads, including one at Stanley, where the golf club is now located. The barn, erected sometime around the 15th or 16th century, still stands.

Sir Piers Legh of Lyme founded St Mary the Virgin Church, completed in 1524 and consecrated as parish church in 1558. The earliest parish register is from 1591.

In 1724, the road from Manchester to Buxton became a turnpike road and in the early 1800s the road was rerouted from its original route along Jackson's Edge road to the current line of the A6.

At the time of the first census, Disley had a population of 995 residents. By 1881 this had increased to 3312, and as of 2019 the population is now in the region of 4600.

The fountain in Fountain Square was donated by the Orfords in 1837 to provide the village with clean water, the stone coming from the Jacksons Edge Road Quarry. It was used until the 1920s.

The village had at least one cotton mill by the mid-19th century. As the cotton industry declined, more varied employment became the norm. As of 2005, there is a paper mill and some light engineering works, but most people travel out to work.

Governance

The parish of Disley was included in the 19th century as one of three parishes in Hayfield rural sanitary district, alongside Hayfield and Mellor in Derbyshire.  In 1894, under the Local Government Act 1894, rural sanitary districts became rural districts, but were required to be entirely within one county or another – this led to Disley, the only Cheshire parish of the sanitary district, to form the Disley Rural District on its own – one of only a few single-parish rural districts to exist.  This remained in existence until 1974, when it was merged into the new Borough of Macclesfield, whilst retaining a parish council.

In April 2008 a referendum was announced for Disley residents because the Borough of Macclesfield was to become part of the new Cheshire East unitary authority as a result of major local government changes in Cheshire in April 2009. Some residents believed that the village would be better served if it were part of the neighbouring boroughs of Stockport in Greater Manchester or High Peak in Derbyshire. On 8 May 2008 this referendum was held, with an overwhelming result in favour of staying within Cheshire; less than a third of electors wished to become part of the Metropolitan Borough of Stockport and an even lower proportion of the population wished the village to become part of High Peak Borough. Macclesfield Borough Council was succeeded on 1 April 2009 by the new unitary authority of Cheshire East.

People

Past

Nearby Wyberslegh Hall (sometimes spelled Wybersley Hall), which stands between Disley and High Lane, was the birthplace of the Anglo-American novelist Christopher Isherwood.

British historian A.J.P. Taylor bought a house in Higher Disley in 1935, for £525, so he could be close to University of Manchester when he was lecturing.

The playwright, critic, essayist and novelist Allan Monkhouse lived at the Grey Cottage on Jackson's Edge Road from 1893 to 1902, and then at Meadow Bank on the same road until his death in 1936.

Lord John Hunt, who led the first successful Mount Everest expedition in 1953, also lived in Disley.

The director and writer Ian Clark was brought up in Disley and attended Disley Primary School.

Present

Disley is also the home of:
Big Brother contestant Anouska Golebiewski.
Presenter of the BBC Bargain Hunt TV programme David Dickinson, who had his first antique shop there.
2008 Paralympics cycling gold medal-winning couple Sarah and Barney Storey.
2008 Olympics cycling gold medal winner Jamie Staff, who moved to Disley for access to Manchester Velodrome.

Transport

Railway

Disley railway station is on the Manchester to Buxton line.

There is generally an hourly service each day to Manchester Piccadilly northbound and to Buxton southbound, with additional services at peak periods.

Roads

The A6, which connects Carlisle with Luton, passes through Disley; it connects the village with Stockport to the north-west and the Peak District to the south-east.

Points of interest
The Rams Head Inn in the centre of the village was built by the Legh family in c.1640, though the current exterior was built around 1840. It was formerly a lodge belonging to the Lyme Park estate. It became a main coaching stop on the Manchester to London route. In 1790, after three visits, Viscount Torrington voted it the best inn in England. The Rams Head is now a restaurant and pub, and only part of what once was its extensive stabling block still remains.

Lyme Park is in the civil parish of Lyme Handley, rather than in Disley parish, but it is sufficiently close to be associated with Disley. The hall was used by the BBC as a setting in its 1995 adaptation of Pride and Prejudice.

The Bowstones are two upright crosses on moorland above Lyme Park on the route of the Gritstone Trail. Their origins are unknown but they are believed to be religious. From here it is possible to see seven counties: Derbyshire, Lancashire, Yorkshire, Cheshire, Staffordshire, Shropshire and Clwyd.

Disley is home to Disley Cricket Club, a member of the TACS Cheshire Cricket League, playing their home games at Disley Amalgamated Sports Club (DASC). The 1st XI play in Division 1 having won the Division 2 championship in 2014 and Division 3 in 2013.

Moorside Golf Club, Higher Disley, first appeared in the 1930s. The club continued until the late 1950s but is now defunct.

Stanley Hall Farmhouse is a Grade-II-listed building from the 16th century. Stanley Hall was given to the Stanleys by the Black Prince in 1388 and bought by the Leghs in 1488. Part of the barn, also Grade II listed, was used as the first clubhouse of the Disley golf club.

Education
Disley has a primary school, Disley Primary School, which in 2020 became an academy as part of The TRUE Learning Partnership, and two nurseries, Blue Grass Purple Cow and Disley Under Fives.

See also

Listed buildings in Disley
St Mary's Church, Disley

References

External links

Villages in Cheshire
Civil parishes in Cheshire
Towns and villages of the Peak District